Volcano is a ghost town in Wood County, West Virginia. It burned to the ground in 1879 and was never rebuilt. It was a petroleum town. Gas flares at night made the skyline appear like a volcano, hence the name. Its Post Office no longer exists.

The Volcano oil field was discovered in 1860, according to the West Virginia Geological and Economic Survey (WVGES), "and from 1865 to 1870, drilling was very active, producing from the Salt sand at a depth of about 360 feet. The heavy lubricants produced led to the development of West Virginia's first oil pipeline, from Volcano to Parkersburg, in 1879."

In 1874, W.C. Stiles, Jr., employed the endless-wire method of pumping many wells from a central engine, "a technique he invented," according to the WVGES. "Using wheels, belts, and cables, perhaps as many as 40 wells could be pumped by one engine. One of the systems operated until 1974."

The Volcano town-site is located south of the US-50 expressway at the junction of Wood County Routes 5 and 28.

References 

Unincorporated communities in West Virginia
Former populated places in West Virginia